Maurizio Anastasi is a former Italian footballer who plays midfielder.

He previously played for Calcio Catania and Avellino. In June he was signed by A.C. Ancona from relegated Serie B team Cesena.

He also played at Eccellenza level from 1998 to 2001 and Serie D at 2001–02.

References

External links
 

1977 births
Living people
People from Riposto
Italian footballers
Catania S.S.D. players
A.C. Cesena players
U.S. Avellino 1912 players
A.C. Ancona players
Association football midfielders
Footballers from Sicily
Sportspeople from the Province of Catania